Venetia Williams (born 10 May 1960) is an English racehorse trainer specialising in National Hunt racing. She is based at stables at Aramstone in Herefordshire, England.

Williams was born at Scorrier House, Cornwall and began as a racehorse trainer at Ty-Pengam. She was an amateur National Hunt jockey until forced to retire after suffering a broken neck in 1988. She worked for racehorse trainers Martin Pipe and John Edwards before taking up a licence to train herself in 1995.

Her most successful horse to date has been Mon Mome, winner of the 2009 Grand National. This victory made her only the second female trainer to win the race, after Jenny Pitman. After the race, even Williams was shocked by the outcome, stating "How can you ever expect that? It's unbelievable." She also trained Teeton Mill, winner of the Hennessy Gold Cup and King George VI Chase in 1998.

She trained Something Wells to a win in the Freddie Williams Festival Plate at the 2009 Cheltenham Festival, saddling the first two home, less than two hours after winning with Kayf Aramis in the Pertemps Final at the same meeting.

See also
 List of female Grand National jockeys

References

External links
 BBC website profile

1960 births
Living people
British racehorse trainers
People from Herefordshire